Erik Ki La Salle (born July 23, 1962), professionally known as Eriq La Salle, is an American actor, director, writer and producer. La Salle is best known for his performance in the film Coming to America (1988) and especially as Dr. Peter Benton in the NBC medical drama ER (1994–2002; 2008–2009) which earned him three NAACP Image Awards and nominations for a Golden Globe Award and three Primetime Emmy Awards.

Early life
La Salle, one of four children, was born and raised in Hartford, Connecticut, by his mother, Ada Haynes. He is an alumnus of Weaver High School and the Artists Collective, Inc. in Hartford. He attended the Juilliard School's Drama Division for two years as a member of Group 13 (1980–84), then attended New York University's Tisch School of the Arts, where he earned a Bachelor of Fine Arts degree from the Graduate Acting Program in 1984.

Career
At the time of his graduation from NYU, La Salle was cast in Joseph Papp's Shakespeare in the Park production of Henry V. Soon after, he found continuous acting work on Broadway, off-Broadway, and on several daytime TV dramas including One Life to Live, where he played the reporter Mike Rivers.

In 1988, La Salle co-starred as the oily Darryl Jenks in the Eddie Murphy movie Coming to America.

In 1994, the medical drama ER premiered on NBC with La Salle starring as Dr. Peter Benton. He held the role until leaving during the eighth season. He returned to ER for three episodes during its 15th and final season, including an uncredited appearance as himself in the opening of "Heal Thyself" to tell the audience of the death of the show's creator Michael Crichton. During season 15, he returned to direct an episode.

On January 31, 2003, he made a cameo appearance in Biker Boyz as Slick Will, a mechanic. He played a Jamaican gangster in the independent film Johnny Was opposite Vinnie Jones, Samantha Mumba, Lennox Lewis, and Roger Daltrey. La Salle lived in Belfast, for four weeks while filming the movie, which he supported at the premiere of the film during the 2006 American Black Film Festival in Miami.

La Salle starred in the Hallmark Channel original movie, Relative Stranger, which premiered on March 14, 2009. Also in the movie was Cicely Tyson, as well as La Salle's former ER castmates Michael Michele (Dr. Cleo Finch) and Michael Beach (Al Boulet). 

In 2010, La Salle played the United Nations Secretary General in the series finale of 24, and guest-starred in an episode of Covert Affairs in August of the same year. In 2011, he played two recurring roles: first as a Caribbean community leader who rallied against the product Rasta Monsta in HBO's How to Make it in America, the second as the neuropsychiatrist E-Mo in CBS' A Gifted Man.

In 1996, La Salle began his directoral career with his debut in the HBO made-for-TV movie Rebound: The Legend of Earl "The Goat" Manigault, starring Don Cheadle, James Earl Jones and Forest Whitaker. Shortly after that, La Salle directed the pilot for Soul Food: The Series on Showtime.

In 2002, he produced the feature film The Salton Sea. That same year, he produced, directed and starred in the movie Crazy as Hell. In 2003 he wrote, directed and starred in "Memphis", an episode of The Twilight Zone. He subsequently directed multiple episodes of Law & Order: Special Victims Unit, CSI: NY, and Ringer as well as the 2012 Hallmark Channel movie Playing Father and NBC’s spinoff Law & Order: Organized Crime.

La Salle's first novel, Laws of Depravity, was published in 2012.

In 2015, La Salle returned to television with a role in Under the Domes third season, after  directing one episode of the second season. He also directed an episode in the third season. He both acted in and directed episodes of CSI: Cyber.  He performed in other series, such as The Night Shift and Madam Secretary.

In 2016, La Salle directed the episode "Wingman" in the Fox series Lucifer and the episode "Black and Blue" of TNT's Murder in the First. He co-starred as Will Munson in the 2017 superhero film Logan. La Salle also directed and produced multiple episodes of Chicago P.D. throughout its many seasons.

Filmography

Film

Television

As director or producer

Awards and nominations

References

External links
 

1962 births
African-American male actors
American male film actors
American male television actors
African-American television directors
American television directors
American film directors
American television writers
American male television writers
Juilliard School alumni
Living people
Tisch School of the Arts alumni
Male actors from Hartford, Connecticut
20th-century American male actors
21st-century American male actors
Chicago (franchise)